Houston Boines (December 30, 1918 – November 8, 1970) was an American blues singer and harmonica player. Boines, accompanied by guitarist Charley Booker, was recruited by talent scout Ike Turner to record for Modern Records in 1952. He also recorded for Sun Records in 1953.

Biography 
Boines was born in Hazlehurst, Mississippi, on December 30, 1918. He was still living in Hazelhurst when he enlisted in the United States Army in January 1941, before the United States entered World War II. After his service, he played with guitarists Charley Booker, Houston Stackhouse, and Eddie Cusic.

In 1952, musician and talent scout Ike Turner brought Boines to record for the Biharis Brothers at Modern. Boines signed to their subsidiary Blues & Rhythm Records. Turner accompanied Boines on piano during the session in Greenville, Mississippi in January 1952.  He also backed Charley Booker on a few tracks during that session. Boines' record ''Going Home'' / ''Relation Blues'' was released on Blues & Rhythm. The single "Superintendent Blues"/"Monkey Motion" was released on Modern's subsidiary RPM Records in August 1952. 

Boines met guitarist Little Milton in Leland, Mississippi. Milton brought Boines to record for Sam Phillips at Sun Records in Memphis, Tennessee. During a session in December 1953, backed by Milton on guitar and Ike Turner on piano, Boines recorded two tracks, including "Carry My Business On." They remained unissued until the latter appeared on the compilation Sun: The Roots Of Rock: Volume 2: Sam's Blues in 1976.

Boines broadcast on the radio program King Biscuit Time on KFFA in Helena, Arkansas. Houston Stackhouse, recalled that Boines was still playing in local clubs later in life, ''but he just faded on out. He'd drink so much." Death records in Mississippi reveal that a man named Huston Boines died on November 8, 1970 in Jackson, it's presumed to be Houston Boines. Stackhouse also confirmed that Boines died around that time.

Discography

Singles 
 1952: "Superintendent Blues" / "Monkey Motion" (RPM 364)
 1952: "Going Home" / "Relation Blues" (Blues & Rhythm 7001)

Album appearances 
 1976: Howlin' Wolf, Little Milton, Houston Boines – Sun: The Roots Of Rock: Volume 2: Sam's Blues (Charly)
 2003: The Modern Downhome Blues Sessions, Volume 2: Mississippi & Arkansas 1952 (Ace)
 2010: Ike Turner – That Kat Sure Could Play! The Singles 1951 To 1957 (Secret Records Limited)

References

External links 
 Houston Boines Credits on AllMusic

1918 births
1970 deaths
People from Hazlehurst, Mississippi
Delta blues musicians
Blues musicians from Mississippi
American blues harmonica players
American rhythm and blues singers
American blues singers
Modern Records artists
RPM Records (United States) artists
Sun Records artists
United States Army soldiers